Eupithecia arauco is a moth in the family Geometridae. It is found the Region of Biobio (Arauco Province) in Chile. The habitat consists of the Northern Valdivian Forest Biotic Province.

The length of the forewings is about 9.5 mm for females. The forewings are dark greyish brown. The hindwings are unicolorous and concolorous with the forewings. Adults have been recorded on wing in January.

Etymology
The specific name is based on the type locality.

References

Moths described in 1991
arauco
Moths of South America
Endemic fauna of Chile